Mlaka may refer to: 

In Croatia:
Mlaka, Croatia, a village in the Municipality of Jasenovac
Velika Mlaka, a village in the Municipality of Velika Gorica
Mala Mlaka, a village in the City of Zagreb

In Slovenia:
Čučja Mlaka, a settlement in the Municipality of Škocjan
Mlaka nad Lušo, a settlement in the Municipality of Gorenja Vas–Poljane
Mlaka pri Kočevju, a settlement in the Municipality of Kočevje
Mlaka pri Kočevski Reki, a settlement in the Municipality of Kočevje
Mlaka pri Kranju, a settlement in the Municipality of Kranj
Mlaka, Radovljica, a settlement in the Municipality of Radovljica
Mlaka, Komenda, a settlement in the Municipality of Komenda
Tunjiška Mlaka, a settlement in the Municipality of Kamnik

See also